The Devonport by-election was a Parliamentary by-election held on 20 June 1904. The constituency returned one Member of Parliament (MP) to the House of Commons of the United Kingdom, elected by the first past the post voting system.

Vacancy
John Lockie had been Conservative MP for one of the seats of Devonport since the 1902 Devonport by-election. He resigned at the age of 43 and died in January 1906.

Electoral history
The seat had been Conservative since he gained it in the 1902 Devonport by-election. Both Devonport seats had been Liberal from 1892-1902.

Candidates

The local Conservative Association selected 53-year-old Sir John Jackson as their candidate to defend the seat. He was a contractors for Public Works. He completed the Admiralty Docks at Keyham, Devonport.

The local Liberal Association selected 54-year-old John Benn as their candidate to gain the seat. Benn was active in the London Dock Strike of 1889, and, as an increasingly prominent London politician, was elected in 1892 as the Liberal Party candidate for St George Division of Tower Hamlets. He was narrowly defeated at the general election in 1895. As a London County Councillor, he helped introduce electric trams to London's streets in 1903. He served as Chairman of the London County Council from 1903-04.

Campaign
Polling Day was fixed for 20 June 1904, just days after the previous MP resigned.

Result
The Liberals re-gained the seat from the Conservatives:

Aftermath
At the following General Election the result was:

References

1904 in England
1904 elections in the United Kingdom
By-elections to the Parliament of the United Kingdom in Devon constituencies
Elections in Plymouth, Devon
20th century in Plymouth, Devon
1900s in Devon